Petra Praise: The Rock Cries Out is the eleventh studio album of the Christian rock band, Petra and their first praise album. It was released on October 3, 1989 by DaySpring Records, marking the band's return to the Word family as the early version of Petra was signed to sister label Myrrh.

The music is mostly a collection of traditional praise songs with a rock style. However, there are two original songs, both written by band founder Bob Hartman.

This album also marked the end of custom artwork on Petra albums. From this album forward Petra would use photos of the band on them for album covers. Compilations by Star Song would continue to use custom artwork though.

Commercially it is the second most successful album of the band, after Beyond Belief. It was certified Gold on January 23, 1998.

In November 1992, Petra released a Spanish-language version of this album called Petra en Alabanza.

Track listing
 "I Love the Lord" (lyrics by Bob Hartman) – 3:35
 "King of Kings" (lyrics and music by Sophie Conty and Naomi Batya) – 1:47
 "Jesus, Jesus, Glorious One" (lyrics and music by Curtis Peifer) – 2:18
 "The Battle Belongs to the Lord" (lyrics and music by Jamie Owens-Collins) – 3:04
 "Take Me In" (lyrics and music by Dave Browning) – 4:11
 "Salvation Belongs to Our God" (lyrics and music by Adrian Turner and Pat Howard) – 2:56
 "The King of Glory Shall Come In" (lyrics and music by Hartman) – 3:10
 "No Weapon Formed Against Us" (unknown author) – 1:44
 "I Will Celebrate/When the Spirit of the Lord" (lyrics and music by Linda Duvall) – 4:15
 "I Will Sing Praise" (lyrics and music by Jacque DeShetler) – 2:45
 "Hallowed Be Thy Name" (lyrics and music by Bill Ancira) – 4:12
 "Friends (All in the Family of God)" (lyrics and music by John Wierick) – 4:20
 "I Will Call Upon the Lord" (lyrics and music by Michael O'Shields) – 3:48
 "We Exalt Thee" (lyrics and music by Pete Sanchez) – 3:46

Awards
 Won Dove Award for Recorded Music Packaging in 1990.

Personnel 
Petra
 Bob Hartman – guitars, arrangements 
 John Schlitt – lead vocals
 John Lawry – keyboards, background vocals, arrangements 
 Ronny Cates – bass
 Louie Weaver – drums

Additional musicians
 Greg Vail – saxophone on "Friends (All In the Family of God)"
 John Elefante – background vocals 
 Walt Harrah – background vocals, vocal arrangements 
 Charlie Hoage – background vocals
 Cathy Riso – background vocals
 Rick Riso – background vocals
 Sara Tennison – background vocals

Production
 Bob Hartman – producer
 John Lawry – producer
 Howard Levy – engineer at The Pond, Franklin, Tennessee
 Gary Heddon – engineer at The Pond
 Dino Elefante  – engineer at Recording Arts, Nashville, Tennessee, engineer and mixing at Pakaderm Studio, Los Alamitos, California, "live" at Trunks Arena 
 Carl Tatz – engineer at Recording Arts
 Mike Miereau – engineer and mixing at Pakaderm Studio, "live" at Trunks Arena 
 John Elefante – engineer and mixing at Pakaderm Studio, "live" at Trunks Arena 
 Jeff Simmons – assistant engineer at Pakaderm Studio, "live" at Trunks Arena 
 Bret Teegarden – mixing at Duckworth Studio, Nashville, Tennessee ("Take Me In" and "Hallowed Be Thy Name")
 Tommy Greer – mixing at Duckworth Studio ("Take Me In" and "Hallowed Be Thy Name")
 Mastered at Future Disc, Hollywood, California
 John Elefante – production assistant 
 Dino Elefante – production assistant 
 Loren Balman – cover concept 
 Teri Short – cover coordinator 
 Jackson Design – design 
 Mark Tucker – photography

Petra en Alabanza

In 1992, Petra released Petra en Alabanza, a Spanish version of Petra Praise: The Rock Cries Out. The album featured almost the same songs, translated by Juan Salinas from Producciones CanZion. Additional voices and choirs were recorded by Gerardo Hernández at Shakin' Studios in Franklin, Tennessee.

Track listing
 "Amo Al Señor" – 3:35
 "Rey de Reyes" – 1:47
 "Cristo Glorioso Rey" – 2:18
 "La Batalla Es De Nuestro Señor" – 3:04
 "Señor Llévame A Tus Atrios" – 4:11
 "La Salvación Es De Nuestro Dios" – 2:56
 "El Rey De Gloria Entrará" – 3:10
 "Yo Celebraré/El Espíritu De Dios" – 4:15
 "Te Alabo" – 2:45
 "Tu Nombre Santo Es" – 4:12
 "Amigos" – 4:20
 "Clamaré a mi Señor" – 3:48
 "Te Exaltamos" – 3:46

References

1989 albums
Petra (band) albums